Netflix Presents: The Characters is an American streaming television comedy sketch show that premiered on Netflix on March 11, 2016. It features eight up-and-coming comedians, who each write and star in their own 30-minute show. The comedians featured in the show are Lauren Lapkus, Kate Berlant, Phil Burgers, Paul W. Downs, John Early, Tim Robinson, Natasha Rothwell, and Henry Zebrowski.
Eight episodes were released on March 11, 2016. The following month, Netflix cancelled the series after one season.

Episodes

Season 1 (2016)

Reception
The series was met with a positive response from critics upon its premiere. The review aggregation website Rotten Tomatoes's critical consensus reads, "Some Characters prove funnier than others in this sketch anthology, but they cumulatively add up to a hilarious showcase for a new generation of comedic talent."

In 2020, Jason Zinoman of the New York Times revisited the series, saying "...if The Characters was a failure, it belongs to the tradition of Fridays and The Dana Carvey Show: noble experiments, unjustly overlooked, that in retrospect were a hotbed of comedy talent in early-stage careers."

In December 2019, Vulture cited three sketches from the show (Natasha Rothwell's "Chiggers", John Early's "The Toast," and Tim Robinson's "Sammy Paradise") in their list of "The 50 Best Comedy Sketches of the Decade."

References

External links

2010s American sketch comedy television series
2016 American television series debuts
2016 American television series endings
English-language Netflix original programming